Biatoridium is a genus of fungi belonging to the order Lecanorales, family unknown.

The species of this genus are found in Europe and Northern America.

Species:

Biatoridium delitescens 
Biatoridium lasiothecium 
Biatoridium monasteriense 
Biatoridium neozelandicum

References

Lecanorales
Lecanorales genera
Lichen genera